Bristol North East was a borough constituency in the  city of Bristol.  It returned one Member of Parliament (MP) to the House of Commons of the Parliament of the United Kingdom.

The constituency was created for the 1950 general election, and abolished for the 1983 general election.

The conduct of the 1951 election was the subject of an academic study, published as Straight Fight in 1954 by R. S. Milne and H.C Mackensie.

Boundaries
1950–1955: The County Borough of Bristol wards of District, Eastville, Hillfields, and Stapleton.

1955–1974: The County Borough of Bristol wards of District, Eastville, Hillfields, and Stapleton, and the Urban District of Mangotsfield.

1974–1983: The County Borough of Bristol wards of Easton, Eastville, Hillfields, St Paul, St Philip and Jacob, and Stapleton.

Members of Parliament

Election results

Elections in the 1950s

Elections in the 1960s

Elections in the 1970s

 Constituency abolished 1983, and split between Bristol East, Bristol North West and Kingswood constituencies.

References

Parliamentary constituencies in South West England (historic)
Constituencies of the Parliament of the United Kingdom established in 1950
Constituencies of the Parliament of the United Kingdom disestablished in 1983
North East